The 2005–06 Superliga Espanola de Hockey Hielo season was the 32nd season of the Superliga Espanola de Hockey Hielo, the top level of ice hockey in Spain. Seven teams participated in the league, and CG Puigcerda won the championship.

Standings

Playoffs

Pre-Playoffs 
 CH Txuri Urdin – CH Val d’Aran Vielha 2:0 (3:1, 4:1)
 CH Madrid – FC Barcelona 0:2 (4:5, 1:9)

Semifinals
 CH Txuri Urdin – CG Puigcerdà 0:2 (2:6, 2:9)
 FC Barcelona – CH Jaca 0:2 (6:7, 4:7)

Final
 CG Puigcerdà – CH Jaca 2:0 (5:4, 3:2)

External links
Season on hockeyarchives.info

Liga Nacional de Hockey Hielo seasons
Spa
Liga